Hamelin is a town in Lower Saxony, Germany.

Hamelin may also refer to:

Places
 Hamelin-Pyrmont, a district in Lower Saxony, Germany
 Hamelin, Manche, a Commune of the Manche department in France
 Hamelin Bay, Western Australia
 Hamelin Pool Marine Nature Reserve, Western Australia
 Hamelin station, a station in Lower Saxony, Germany
 Hamelin Station Reserve, a former pastoral lease in Western Australia

People

Given name
 Hamelin de Balun (died 1105 or 1106), Norman baron
 Hamelin de Warenne, Earl of Surrey (1129–1202), English nobleman
 Hamelin du Devonshire et de Cornwall, held 22 manors in 1086, including the Manor of Broad Hempston

Surname
 Jacques Hamelin, bishop of Tulle, secretary to Francis I
 Isabel Hamelin, 15th century, married to Sir Thomas Berkeley, of the House of Berkley
 William Hamelin, High Sheriff of Warwickshire 1275–1277
 Fortunée Hamelin, wife of Romain Hamelin, friend of Empress Joséphine
 Bob Hamelin (born 1967), American former baseball player
 Charles Hamelin (born 1984), Canadian speed skater
 François Hamelin (born 1986), Canadian speed skater
 Charles-André Hamelin (1947–1993), Canadian politician
 Dave Hamelin (born 1980), Canadian guitarist (The Stills)
 Ferdinand-Alphonse Hamelin (1796–1864), French admiral
 Jacques Félix Emmanuel Hamelin (also Emmanuel Hamelin) (1768–1839), French rear admiral
 Jean-Baptiste Hamelin (1733–1804), French Canadian soldier
 Jean-Guy Hamelin (1925–2018), Canadian Roman Catholic bishop
 Joseph Hamelin (1873–1947), Canadian politician
 Louis-Edmond Hamelin (1923–2020), Canadian geographer
 Marc-André Hamelin (born 1961), Canadian virtuoso pianist
 Octave Hamelin (1856–1907), French philosopher
 Charles Richard-Hamelin (born 1989), Canadian pianist

Other uses
 Hamelin ctenotus, a species of Australian skink

See also 

 Hamlin (disambiguation)
 Hamel (disambiguation)
 Hammel (disambiguation)
 Pied Piper of Hamelin (disambiguation)
 Pied Piper of Hamelin
 Violinist of Hameln, a manga series